Hardesty & Hanover is an American infrastructure engineering company specializing in the design and management of bridges and other transportation and architecture projects.  The firm was founded in 1887 by John Alexander Low Waddell, a structural engineer who pioneered the design of large-scale moveable bridge.  Originally incorporated in Kansas City, Missouri as J.A.L. Waddell, Consulting Engineer, the company was renamed throughout the early 20th century as Waddell added junior partners to the organization.  In 1920, the firm moved its headquarters to New York City, where it would go on to design many important bridges int the area, such as Newark Bay Bridge (rail), the original Goethals Bridge, and Marine Parkway Bridge.  

In recent decades the company has expanded its footprint to the fields of highway design and movable architecture, contributing to projects like U.S. Bank Stadium, the New York City Shed, the redevelopment of LaGuardia Airport, and other major interchanges of highways in New York City.

History

J.A.L. Waddell, Consulting Engineer (1887) 

Waddell's private consultancy gained a reputation for "daring and unusual structures" with a modern approach to the bridge design, and construction process. The company's first project, the Illinois Central Missouri River Bridge, was a swing bridge designed by Waddell in 1893 and built across the Missouri River.  At the time of its construction, it was the longest swing bridge in the world with a moving span of 520 ft (158.5 m).

A year later in 1894, Waddell designed the South Halsted Street Bridge over the Chicago River.  As the world's first major vertical-lift bridge, the project had a significant impact on infrastructure design.

Waddell and Hedrick, Consulting Engineers (1899) 
In 1899 Waddell promoted his chief draftsman Ira G. Hedrick to partner, renaming the firm Waddell & Hedrick. This partnership produced what would become the company's oldest design still in operation as of 2021: the New Westminster Bridge.

Waddell and Harrington (1907) 
In 1907 the company became known as Waddell & Harrington when Waddell partnered with John L. Harrington, former Chief Engineer of the Locomotive & Machine Company of Montreal. While still headquartered in Kansas City, the firm also maintained offices in Portland, Oregon, and Vancouver, British Columbia.  

In 1908 Waddell & Harrington patented an improved Bascule bridge.  That summer they also filed the first of several patents for improvements to Waddell's earlier vertical-lift bridge designs,

In their time together, Waddell & Harrington designed at least thirty highway and railroad bridges, and four remain in operation as of 2021 (three of them in the iconic vertical-lift style):  Hawthorne Bridge (1910), ASB Bridge (1911), Colorado St. (Arroyo Seco) Bridge (1913), and Murray Morgan Bridge (1913).

In 1914, Waddell & Harrington announced the dissolution of their partnership effective in July of the following year.  Harrington would continue working with his colleague, draftsman Frank Cortelyou, in new firm known as Harrington, Howard & Ash (which would eventually become HNTB).

Waddell and Son (1915) 
In 1915, Waddell promoted Needham Everett to junior partner, renaming the firm Waddell & Son.  That same year, they celebrated the opening of the LS&MS Railway Bridge No. 6 in Chicago, IL, and a satellite office in New York City, though the younger Waddell reportedly stayed behind to manage the Kansas City office through at least 1918. In 1916, Shortridge Hardesty (who had previously been hand-picked to join the firm shortly after his 1908 graduation from Rensselaer Polytechnic Institute) was promoted to Designing Engineer.

The firm did well, receiving many contracts during the post-war economic revival, and the New York office became its headquarters in 1920. 

Needham Everett died in 1927.

Waddell and Hardesty (1927) 
After the death of his son, Waddell continued to lead the firm, promoting Hardesty to Partner. They continued to create important bridges; the CRRNJ Newark Bay Bridge (1926), original Goethals Bridge and Outerbridge Crossing (1928), and Marine Parkway Bridge (1937).  In 1931 Waddell was personally honored with the American Association of Engineers' Clausen Gold Medal award for "distinguished service to the engineering profession", and again in 1937 with the American Society of Civil Engineers (ASCE) Norman Medal.  He died in 1938 at the age of 84, leaving Hardesty to run the company.

Hardesty & Hanover (1945) 
In 1945, Hardesty took on Clinton Hanover (former Chief of the New York City Bureau of Bridge Design) as a partner. The duo's leadership saw completion of the Rainbow Bridge in 1941.  Spanning Niagara Falls, the structure was honored with the 1941 American Institute of Steel Construction (AISC) 1st Place "Class A" Prize Bridge Award for beauty.

In the following decades, the company developed many other moveable and fixed bridges across New York State and beyond.  One of its earliest forays into moveable architecture was an amusement ride for the 1964 New York World's Fair that took the form of a Ferris wheel, known as the Uniroyal Giant Tire.

Among H&H's first highway projects was the Interstate 80 and Route 19 interchange in Paterson, New Jersey. The company has continued to design roadways, most recently the reconstruction of LaGuardia Airport and Kew Gardens Interchange.  The latter project features NEXT Beam technology in one of its 15 bridges.

Notable projects 
Companies established in 1887Companies based in New York CityEngineering companies of the United States

Construction and civil engineering companies of the United States

References